The SZD-17X Jaskółka L was a single-seat high-performance competition glider designed and built in Poland at Szybowcowy Zakład Doświadczalny (Glider Experimental Works) in Bielsko-Biała in 1955.

Development 
The  SZD-17X Jaskółka L (Swallow Laminar) drew on the experience gained from developing the SZD-11 and SZD-14X gliders combined with new laminar flow aerofoil sections and flaps, as well as provision for water ballast and a fully retractable undercarriage. Main designer was Tadeusz Kostia, main constructor Jan Dyrek. Construction of the SZD-17X was of conventional wooden semi-monocoque fuselage and thick skinned wooden wings with wooden spars, retaining the Jerzy Rudlicki's butterfly tail of the SZD-14X. First flight of the SZD-17X took place at Bielsko airfield, flown by Adam Zientek, on 9 March 1956.

Four aircraft, (reg'n no.'s SP-1504 to SP-1507), were built for use in 1956 World Gliding Championships, but performance fell short of expectations and they finally were not used there. Despite the disappointing performance, Tadeusz Góra was able to establish a cross-country speed record on 9 May 1956 whilst flying SP-1506. SP-1506 was used until 1977, then it was given to the Polish Aviation Museum. The glider was nicknamed laminarka, due to its laminar flow profile.

Specifications (SZD-17X Jaskółka L)

Note: A. Glass quotes different specifications: maximum glide ratio 30.5 @ 98 km/h; best sink rate 0.86 m/s @ 93 km/h; wing loading 31.2 kg/m2 (40 with ballast).

See also

Notes

References

Glass, Andrzej (ed) (1965) Konstrukcje lotnicze Polski Ludowej [Aviation constructions of People's Poland], WKiŁ, Warsaw, p. 64–68 (Polish)

Further reading
Taylor, J. H. (ed) (1989) Jane's Encyclopedia of Aviation. Studio Editions: London. p. 29

External links

 http://www.piotrp.de/SZYBOWCE/pszd17.htm
 http://www.muzeumlotnictwa.pl/zbiory_sz.php?ido=92&w=a
 http://www.flightglobal.com/pdfarchive/view/1958/1958%20-%200793.html
 http://www.flightglobal.com/pdfarchive/view/1958/1958%20-%200794.html
http://www.airwar.ru/enc/glider/szd17.html
http://www.luftfahrtmuseum.com/htmi/ite/szd17.htm

1950s Polish sailplanes
SZD aircraft
Aircraft first flown in 1956